Love is the second studio album by Japanese entertainer Mika Nakashima, and her third overall album release counting the mini-album Resistance. Its release date was November 6, 2003, in Japan, prior to the Christmas holiday. In contrast to her previous album, True, this album boasts a wider range of styles including ballads, soft reggae, and club jazz.  It proved to be a successful move as the album outsold her debut; it topped the Oricon 200 Album Chart upon release and sold just over 437,000 copies in Japan alone the week it came out.

Love won the 2003 Best Album Award at the Japan Record Awards, and has sold 1,447,681 copies to date - making this album the best-selling album in Mika's career.

Track listing

Charts and sales

Oricon sales charts (Japan)

Singles

2003 albums
Mika Nakashima albums